Stanhopea saccata is a species of orchid occurring from Mexico (Chiapas) to Central America.

References

External links 

saccata
Orchids of Chiapas
Orchids of Central America